Cecil Park is a suburb of Sydney, in the state of New South Wales, Australia 40 kilometres west of the Sydney central business district, in the local government area of the City of Fairfield. It is part of the Greater Western Sydney region.

History 
Cecil Park was originally home to the Cabrogal people who occupied much of the greater Fairfield area. When European exploration of the area began in the early 19th century, a nearby range was named Cecil Hills and this in turn inspired the name Cecil Park. The first white settler in Cecil Park was Simeon Lord.

Cecil Park Post Office opened on 16 July 1897 and closed in 1966.

Demographics 
At the 2016 census, there were 771 residents in Cecil Park. 65.1% of people were born in Australia. The most common other countries of birth were Italy 7.5%, Malta 2.8%, Iran 2.0%, Fiji 1.9% and Lebanon 1.6%. In Cecil Park 54.6% of people only spoke English at home. Other languages spoken at home included Italian 12.4%, Croatian 3.3%, Serbian 2.9%, Maltese 2.2% and Spanish 2.2%.

Common ancestries include, Italian 24.3%, Australian 12.2%, English 10.0%, Maltese 8.5% and Croatian 4.2%. The most common response for religion was Catholic at 54.5%.

References 

Suburbs of Sydney
City of Fairfield
City of Liverpool (New South Wales)